Caumont-sur-Aure (literally Caumont on Aure) is a commune in the department of Calvados, northwestern France. The municipality was established on 1 January 2017 by merger of the former communes of Caumont-l'Éventé (the seat), Livry and La Vacquerie.

Population

See also 
Communes of the Calvados department

References 

Communes of Calvados (department)